Ruth Prawer Jhabvala  (7 May 19273 April 2013) was a German-born novelist and screenwriter. She is best known for her collaboration with Merchant Ivory Productions, made up of film director James Ivory and producer Ismail Merchant.

In 1951, she married Indian architect Cyrus Jhabvala and moved to New Delhi. She began then to elaborate her experiences in India and wrote novels and tales on Indian subjects. She wrote a dozen novels, 23 screenplays, and eight collections of short stories and was made a CBE in 1998 and granted a joint fellowship by BAFTA in 2002 with Ivory and Merchant. She is the only person to have won both a Booker Prize and an Oscar.

Early life
Ruth Prawer was born in Cologne, Germany to Jewish parents Marcus and Eleanora (Cohn) Prawer. Marcus was a lawyer who moved to Germany from Poland to escape conscription and Eleanora's father was cantor of Cologne's largest synagogue. Her father was accused of communist links, arrested and released, and she witnessed the violence unleashed against the Jews during the Kristallnacht. The family was among the last group of refugees to flee the Nazi regime in 1939, emigrating to Britain. Her elder brother, Siegbert Salomon Prawer (1925–2012), an expert on Heinrich Heine and horror films, was fellow of The Queen's College and Taylor Professor of German Language and Literature at the University of Oxford.

During World War II, Prawer lived in Hendon in London, experienced the Blitz and began to speak English rather than German. Charles Dickens' works and Margaret Mitchell's Gone with the Wind kept her company through the war years, and she read the latter book while taking refuge in air raid shelters during the Luftwaffes bombing of London. She became a British citizen in 1948. The following year, her father committed suicide after discovering that 40 members of his family had been murdered during the Holocaust. Prawer attended Hendon County School (now Hendon School) and then Queen Mary College, where she received an MA in English literature in 1951.

Literary career

Years in India 
Ruth Prawer lived in India for 24 years from 1951. Her first novel, To Whom She Will, was published in 1955. It was followed by Esmond in India (1957), The Householder (1960) and Get Ready for Battle (1963). The Householder, with a screenplay by Jhabvala, was filmed in 1963 by Merchant and Ivory. During her years in India, she wrote scripts for the Merchant-Ivory duo for The Guru (1969) and Autobiography of a Princess (1975). She collaborated with Ivory for the screenplays for Bombay Talkie (1970) and ABC After-school Specials: William - The Life and Times of William Shakespeare (1973).

In 1975, she won the Booker Prize for her novel Heat and Dust, later adapted into a film. That year, she moved to New York where she wrote The Place of Peace. Her husband also moved to US permanently in late 1980s, and the couple lived on the east coast until Ruth's death in 2013.  Cyrus Jhabwala died in Los Angeles in 2014. 

Jhabvala "remained ill at ease with India and all that it brought into her life." She wrote in an autobiographical essay, Myself in India (published in London Magazine) that she found the "great animal of poverty and backwardness" made the idea and sensation of India intolerable to her, a "Central European with an English education and a deplorable tendency to constant self-analysis." Her early works in India dwell on the themes of romantic love and arranged marriages and are portraits of the social mores, idealism and chaos of the early decades of independent India. Writing about her in the New York Times, novelist Pankaj Mishra observed that "she was probably the first writer in English to see that India's Westernizing middle class, so preoccupied with marriage, lent itself well to Jane Austenish comedies of manners."

Life in the United States 
Jhabvala moved to New York City in 1975 and lived there until her death in 2013, becoming a naturalized citizen of the United States in 1986. She continued to write and many of her works including In Search of Love and Beauty (1983), Three Continents (1987), Shards of Memory (1995) and East into Upper East: Plain Tales From New York and New Delhi (1998) portray the lives and predicaments of immigrants from post-Nazi and post-World War Europe. Many of these works feature India as a setting where her characters go in search of spiritual enlightenment only to emerge defrauded and exposed to the materialistic pursuits of the East. The New York Times Review of Books chose her Out of India (1986) as one of the best reads for that year. In 1984, she was awarded a MacArthur Fellowship.

In 2005 she published My Nine Lives: Chapters of a Possible Past with illustrations by her husband and the book was described as "her most autobiographical fiction to date".

Reception 
Her literary works were well received with C.P. Snow, Rumer Godden and V.S. Pritchett describing her work as "the highest art", "a balance between subtlety, humour and beauty" and as being Chekhovian in its detached sense of comic self-delusion. Salman Rushdie described her as a "rootless intellectual" when he anthologized her in the Vintage Book of Indian Writing, and John Updike described her an "initiated outsider".

Jhabvala initially was assumed to be an Indian among the reading public because of her perceptive portrayals of the nuances of Indian lifestyles. Later, the revelation of her true identity led to falling sales of her books in India and made her a target of accusations about "her old-fashioned colonial attitudes".

Jhabvala's last published story was "The Judge's Will", which appeared in The New Yorker on 25 March 2013.

Merchant Ivory Productions

In 1963, Jhabvala was approached by James Ivory and Ismail Merchant to write a screenplay for their debut The Householder, based on her 1960 novel. During their first encounter, Merchant later said Jhabvala, seeking to avoid them, pretended to be the housemaid when they visited. The film, released by Merchant Ivory Productions in 1963 and starring Shashi Kapoor and Leela Naidu, met with critical praise and marked the beginning of a partnership that resulted in over 20 films.

The Householder was followed by Shakespeare Wallah (1965), another critically acclaimed film. There followed a series of films, including Roseland (1977), Hullabaloo Over Georgie and Bonnie's Pictures (1978), The Europeans (1979), Jane Austen in Manhattan (1980), Quartet (1981), The Courtesans of Bombay (1983) and The Bostonians (1984). The Merchant Ivory production of Heat and Dust in 1983 won Jhabvala a BAFTA Award for Best Adapted Screenplay the following year.

She won her first Academy Award for her screenplay for A Room with a View (1986) and won a second in the same category for Howards End six years later. She was nominated for a third Academy Award for Best Adapted Screenplay the following year for The Remains of the Day.

Her other films with Merchant and Ivory include Mr. and Mrs. Bridge (1990), Jefferson in Paris (1995), Surviving Picasso (1996), A Soldier's Daughter Never Cries (1998) (the screenplay for which she co-authored with Ivory), The Golden Bowl (2000) and The City of Your Final Destination (2009), adapted from the eponymous novel by Peter Cameron and was her last screenplay. Le Divorce which she co-wrote with Ivory was the last movie that featured the trio of Merchant, Ivory and Jhabvala.

In an interview for the British Film Institute, British actor James Wilby claimed that Jhabvala refused to write the screenplay of the 1987 film Maurice despite being "the normal writer" for Merchant-Ivory films. Wilby surmised that Jhabvala may have been uncomfortable with the central subject matter of the film, based on a posthumously published novel by E.M. Forster, which depicted a gay relationship set in Edwardian England. Ivory was reportedly "quite upset" by Jhabvala's decision, given the fact that their friendship was "incredibly close." For her own part, Jhabvala apparently did provide notes for Maurice, but claimed she didn't wish to write the screenplay, as the novel was "sub-Forster and sub-Ivory."

The Merchant-Ivory duo was acknowledged by the Guinness Book of World Records as the longest collaboration between a director and a producer, but Jhabvala was a part of the trio from the very beginning. She introduced the composer Richard Robbins, who went on to score music for almost every production by Merchant-Ivory beginning with The Europeans in 1979, to the duo after meeting him while he was the director of Mannes College of Music, New York. Madame Sousatzka (1988) was the one film she wrote that was not produced by Merchant Ivory.

Selected filmography

Awards and nominations
Academy Awards

Golden Globe Awards

British Academy Film Awards

Writers Guild of America Awards

Honors 
1975: Booker Prize – Heat and Dust
1976: Guggenheim Fellowship
1979: Neil Gunn Prize
1984: MacArthur Fellowship
1984: London Critics Circle Film Awards – Screenwriter of the Year for: Heat and Dust
1990: New York Film Critics Circle - Best Screenplay: Mr. and Mrs. Bridge
2003: O. Henry Prize Winner for "Refuge in London"

Personal life
In 1951, Prawer married Cyrus Shavaksha Hormusji Jhabvala, an Indian Parsi architect and, later, head of the School of Planning and Architecture, New Delhi. The couple moved into a house in Delhi's Civil Lines where they raised three daughters: Ava, Firoza and Renana. In 1975, Jhabvala moved to New York and divided her time between India and the United States. In 1986, she became a naturalized citizen of the United States.

Death
Jhabvala died in her home in New York City on 3 April 2013 at the age of 85. James Ivory reported that her death was caused by complications from a pulmonary disorder. Reacting to her death, Merchant Ivory Productions noted that Jhabvala had "been a beloved member of the Merchant Ivory family since 1960, comprising one-third of our indomitable trifecta that included director James Ivory and the late producer Ismail Merchant" and that her death was "a significant loss to the global film community".

Literary works

Novels and novellas

Short stories and collections

Critical studies and reviews of Jhabvala's work

Anthologies and encyclopedias
 
 
 
 

Screenwriting
 
 

Other

References

Further reading

External links 
 
 
 

1927 births
2013 deaths
Alumni of Queen Mary University of London
Booker Prize winners
British screenwriters
English emigrants to India
English emigrants to the United States
English Jewish writers
Jewish emigrants from Nazi Germany to the United Kingdom
Jewish novelists
MacArthur Fellows
English people of Polish-Jewish descent
American short story writers
American women screenwriters
Fellows of the Royal Society of Literature
Writers Guild of America Award winners
Commanders of the Order of the British Empire
Best Adapted Screenplay Academy Award winners
Best Adapted Screenplay BAFTA Award winners
20th-century English novelists
21st-century English novelists
20th-century American novelists
21st-century American novelists
20th-century English women writers
21st-century American women writers
The New Yorker people
German emigrants to India
German emigrants to the United States
German people of Polish-Jewish descent
Naturalised citizens of the United Kingdom
People with acquired American citizenship
Writers from London
Deaths from lung disease
20th-century American women writers
21st-century English women
O. Henry Award winners